Last of the Good Straight Girls is the third album by American singer-songwriter Susan Werner, released in 1995 (see 1995 in music). This was Werner's first major label album.

Track listing
All songs written by Susan Werner, except where noted

"Last of the Good Straight Girls" – 3:43
"Still Believe" – 5:19
"Man I Used to Love" – 4:09
"St. Mary's of Regret" – 4:09
"No One Here but Me" (Fernando Saunders, Werner) – 4:16
"Through the Glass" (Saunders, Werner) – 4:40
"Some Other Town" (Saunders, Werner) – 4:07
"Yes to You (Tappan Zee)" – 4:08
"Something So Right" (Paul Simon) – 5:25
"Signing Your Name" – 5:13
"Much at All" – 3:14

Personnel
Susan Werner – vocals
Marshall Crenshaw – electric guitar
Mitchell Froom – keyboards
Zachary Richard

Production
Producer: Fernando Saunders
Assistant engineer: Jodie Zalewski

References

Susan Werner albums
1995 albums